Cennetpınar is a village in the Çayırlı District, Erzincan Province, Turkey. The village had a population of 213 in 2021. The hamlets of Akpınar and Perçem are attached to it.

References 

Villages in Çayırlı District